Alas! is an interjection used to express regret, sorrow, or grief.

Alas may also refer to:

Music
 Alas (band), progressive metal band from USA
 ALAS (band), a mid-1970s Argentine progressive rock band

Organizations
 ALAS Foundation or Fundacion América Latina en Acción Solidaria, an organization dedicated to children living in poverty in Latin America
 Artificial Limb & Appliance Service, an organisation providing support, equipment and rehabilitation to people with limb impairment

Places
 Alas (East Timor), a town in Alas Subdistrict
 Alàs, a village in the municipality of Alàs i Cerc, Catalonia, Spain
 Alas, Iran, a village in North Khorasan Province, Iran
 Alas Administrative Post, Manufahi District, East Timor
 Alas Islands, part of Papua New Guinea

Science
 Alas (geography), a steep-sided depression that is formed by the melting of ice and sometimes contains a lake
 5-aminolevulinate synthase, an enzyme expressed in eukaryotes in two forms: ALAS1 and ALAS2
 Aluminium arsenide or  AlAs, a semiconductor material

Other
 Alas!, an 1890 work of literature by Rhoda Broughton
 ALAS (missile), a Serbian long-range ground attack missile
 Alas (surname)
 Alas language, an Austronesian language of Sumatra
 Alas people, an ethnic group in Aceh, Indonesia
 Alas River, a river of Aceh, Indonesia

See also